Jan Burian (born March 26, 1952) is a Czech pianist, lyricist, songwriter, TV presenter.

Burian was born in Prague, Czechoslovakia, the son of Emil František Burian.

He performed in tandem with Jiří Dědeček in the years 1973-1985.

Czech Television aired his talk show "Sitting with Jan Burian" and the series "Burian Women's Day". He featured the awarding of literary prizes Magnesia Litera for several seasons.

External links
 
 Jan Burian official page 
 Jan Burian blog

References

1952 births
Musicians from Prague
Czech poets
Czech male poets
Czech television presenters
Czech pianists
21st-century Czech male singers
Czech bloggers
Living people
Writers from Prague
Male pianists
21st-century pianists
Male bloggers
20th-century Czech male singers
Czechoslovak male singers